The 1899 San Diego mayoral election was held on April 4, 1899 to elect the mayor for San Diego. Edwin M. Capps was elected Mayor with a majority of the votes.

Candidates
Edwin M. Capps, city engineer
John Helphingstine
Daniel C. Reed, Mayor of San Diego

Campaign
Incumbent Mayor Daniel C. Reed stood for re-election to a second two-year term as a Republican. His re-election was contested by Edwin M. Capps, a Democrat, and John Helphingstine of the Socialist Labor party.

One of the biggest issues during the campaign was municipal ownership of the water system. Capps, the city engineer, was seen as friendly to the San Diego Flume Company, while Reed was supported by the Southern California Mountain Water Company.

On April 4, 1899, Capps was elected mayor with a majority of 52.3 percent of the vote. Reed came in second with 45.6 percent of the vote. Helphingstine came in third with only 2.1 percent.

Election results

References

1899
1899 California elections
1899 United States mayoral elections
1890s in San Diego
April 1899 events